Sulzfeld may refer to the following places in Germany:

Sulzfeld, Baden-Württemberg, in the district of Karlsruhe
Sulzfeld, Rhön-Grabfeld, in the district of Rhön-Grabfeld, Bavaria
Sulzfeld am Main, in the district of Kitzingen, Bavaria